The Delta baryons (or  baryons, also called Delta resonances) are a family of subatomic particle made of three up or down quarks (u or d quarks), the same constituent quarks that make up the more familiar protons and neutrons.

Properties 

The  (uud) and  (udd) particles are higher-mass spin-excitations of the proton ( uud) and neutron ( udd), respectively.

The Delta states discussed here are only the lowest-mass quantum excitations of the proton and neutron. A complete listing of all properties of all these states can be found in Beringer et al. (2013).

There also exist antiparticle Delta states with opposite charges, made up of the corresponding antiquarks.

Discovery 

The states were established experimentally at the University of Chicago cyclotron
and the Carnegie Institute of Technology synchro-cyclotron
in the mid-1950s using accelerated positive pions on hydrogen targets.

Formation and decay 
The Delta states are created when an sufficiently energetic probe – such as a photon, electron, neutrino, or pion – impinges upon a proton or neutron, or possibly by the collision of a sufficiently energetic nucleon pair.

All of the Δ baryons with mass near  quickly decay via the strong force into a nucleon (proton or neutron) and a pion of appropriate charge. The relative probabilities of allowed final charge states are given by their respective isospin couplings. More rarely and more slowly, the  can decay into a proton and a photon and the  can decay into a neutron and a photon.

List 

[a]  PDG reports the resonance width (Γ). Here the conversion  is given instead.

References

Bibliography 

 

Baryons